Jabal Sarāj or Jabal al-Sirāj is a district of Parwan province located north of the capital Kabul, Afghanistan. Located near Charikar, Gulbahar and the Salang Pass, it is surrounded by the high peaks of mountains. During summer, people from Kabul and other provinces come to Jabal Saraj for vacation. The capital is the town of Jabal Saraj.

Jabal Saraj is a historic village of Afghanistan named by King Habibullah in the beginning of the 20th century as this district was one of the favourite sightseeing areas for the King with a special palace for the summer. Jabal Saraj's economy relies on a textile factory, built in 1937, a cement factory and agriculture. The grand historic palace, built in 1907, was rebuilt in 2019 and opened as the Museum of Afghan Jihad and Resistance, about the anti-Soviet war resistance.

Demographics
The district is 100% Tajik.

References

Districts of Parwan Province